The Dr. Busch-Memorial is a Group 3 flat horse race in Germany open to three-year-old thoroughbreds.

History
The event used to be held at Hoppegarten, and it was originally known as the Preis von Dahlwitz. It was transferred to Krefeld in 1950, and from this point it was called the Paul Döring-Rennen. It was subsequently renamed in memory of Max Busch, a former president of Krefeld Racecourse.

For a period the Dr. Busch-Memorial was contested over 1,650 metres. It was extended to 1,700 metres in 1968.

The Dr. Busch-Memorial was given Group 3 status in 1994. That year's edition was run over 1,600 metres at Cologne. It was run over the same distance at Hoppegarten in 1997. It was relegated to Listed level and cut to 1,400 metres in 1998.

The race reverted to 1,700 metres in 1999. It was promoted back to Group 3 in 2000.

Records
Leading jockey since 1950 (6 wins):
 Fritz Drechsler – Waldcanter (1959), Gladstone (1963), Bacchus (1968), Hitchcock (1969), Honduras (1973), Loisach (1974)
 Georg Bocskai – Tombos (1982), Lagunas (1984), Bismarck (1985), Zampano (1987), Kalambo (1988), Mandelbaum (1990)

Leading trainer since 1950 (12 wins):
 Heinz Jentzsch – Dschingis Khan (1964), Bacchus (1968), Hitchcock (1969), Honduras (1973), Swazi (1976), Trianon (1978), Tombos (1982), Lagunas (1984), Bismarck (1985), Zampano (1987), Kalambo (1988), Surako (1996)

Winners since 1980

Earlier winners

 1950: Firmament
 1951: Neckar
 1952: Bernadette
 1953: Naxos
 1954: Atatürk
 1955: Masetto
 1956: Bernardus
 1957: Menes
 1958: Pfalzteufel
 1959: Waldcanter
 1960: Wiener Walzer
 1961: Orlog
 1962: Mardonios
 1963: Gladstone
 1964: Dschingis Khan
 1965: Fioravanti
 1966: Volvo
 1967: Obermain
 1968: Bacchus
 1969: Hitchcock
 1970: Gerona
 1971: Dulcia
 1972: Caracol
 1973: Honduras
 1974: Loisach
 1975: Kronenkranich
 1976: Swazi
 1977: Cagliostro
 1978: Trianon
 1979: Nebos

See also
 List of German flat horse races

References
 Racing Post / siegerlisten.com:
 1983, 1984, 1985, 1986, 1987, 1988, 1989, 1990, 1991, 1992
 1993, 
 galopp-sieger.de – Dr. Busch-Memorial.
 horseracingintfed.com – International Federation of Horseracing Authorities – Dr. Busch Memorial (2018).
 pedigreequery.com – Dr. Busch-Memorial – Krefeld.

Flat horse races for three-year-olds
Sport in North Rhine-Westphalia
Horse races in Germany